Hinomaru Sumo is an anime series adapted from the manga of the same title by Kawada. It is directed by Yasutaka Yamamoto at Gonzo and Kii Tanaka is the character designer. The 24-episode anime television series aired from October 5, 2018 to March 29, 2019. Crunchyroll simulcast the series, while Funimation produced an English dub.


Episode list

Notes

References

Hinomaru Sumo